Bi Nahr-e Olya (also Romanized as Bī Nahr-e ‘Olyā; also known as Bīnahr-e ‘Olyā) is a village in Qalkhani Rural District, Gahvareh District, Dalahu County, Kermanshah Province, Iran. At the 2006 census, its population was 268, in 57 families.

References 

Populated places in Dalahu County